Lucky Fork is an unincorporated community located in Owsley County, Kentucky, United States. Their Post Office  no longer exists, it closed in June 1972.

According to tradition, Lucky Fork was so named on account of the area being a hunter's paradise.

References

Unincorporated communities in Owsley County, Kentucky
Unincorporated communities in Kentucky